Coalition of Democratic Forces may refer to:
Coalition of Democratic Forces (Burkina Faso)
Coalition of Democratic Forces (Kazakhstan)
Coalition of Democratic Forces (Rwanda)